Veres is a surname with multiple origins. It means "red" in Hungary and the same surname appears as Vereș in Romania. The unrelated Ukrainian surname Veres means "heather".

People

Veres
Dave Veres, (Born 1966), American baseball player
Győző Veres, (1936–2011), Hungarian weightlifter
János Veres, Hungarian politician
John Veres, American academic administrator and educator
Mariska Veres (1947–2006), Dutch singer
Péter Veres (politician) (1897–1970), Hungarian politician
Péter Veres (volleyball), Hungarian volleyball player
Randy Veres (1965–2016), American baseball player
Valentina Veres (born 1942), Ukrainian textile artist and master weaver

Vereș
Carol Vereș
Nicolae Vereș
Romulus Vereș

See also
 NK Veres Rivne, Ukrainian football club
 

Hungarian-language surnames
Ukrainian-language surnames